Amsacta nivea is a moth of the family Erebidae. It was described by George Hampson in 1916. It is found in South Africa.

References

Endemic moths of South Africa
Moths described in 1916
Spilosomina
Moths of Africa